Heartbreaker is the debut solo studio album by American singer/songwriter Ryan Adams, released September 5, 2000 on Bloodshot Records. The album was recorded over fourteen days at Woodland Studios in Nashville, Tennessee. It was nominated for the 2001 Shortlist Music Prize. The album is said to be inspired by Adams' break-up with music industry publicist Amy Lombardi.

According to Adams, the album's title originates from a poster of Mariah Carey: "My manager called and said, 'You have 15 seconds to name this record,' "My eyes focused on this poster of Mariah wearing a T-shirt that said HEARTBREAKER. I just shouted, 'Heartbreaker!'"

A Deluxe Edition, featuring bonus recording session takes and pre-album demos, was released on May 6, 2016 on PAX-AM records.

Critical reception

Heartbreaker was considered by critics to be a fresh start for Ryan Adams after the demise of his previous band Whiskeytown. AllMusic's Mark Derning wrote that the album "is loose, open, and heartfelt in a way Whiskeytown's admittedly fine albums never were, and makes as strong a case for Adams' gifts as anything his band ever released", concluding that "the strength of the material and the performances suggest Adams is finally gaining some much-needed maturity, and his music is all the better for it." The A.V. Clubs Keith Phipps wrote: "Adams has recorded an intimate, largely quiet record that indisputably establishes his identity as an independent singer-songwriter". Pitchforks Steven Byrd called it "an album of astonishing musical proficiency, complete honesty and severe beauty." Rolling Stone'''s Anthony DeCurtis was less enthusiastic, stating that Adams' songs "too often fail to rise above their plain-spoken details to take on the symbolic power he yearns for". Robert Christgau of The Village Voice selected "To Be Young (Is to Be Sad, Is to Be High)" as a "choice cut", indicating a "good song on an album that isn't worth your time or money."

The album was included in the book 1001 Albums You Must Hear Before You Die and was placed at #23 on Paste Magazine's "The 50 Best Albums of the Decade" list.

Track listing

  A brief recording of Adams and Rawlings arguing about which album the track "Suedehead" appears on.

Personnel

Musicians
 Ryan Adams - vocals, acoustic guitar, electric guitar, harmonica, piano, banjo
 Ethan Johns - drums, bass, Chamberlain, glockenspiel, B-3, vibes
 David Rawlings - backing vocals, acoustic guitar, electric guitar, banjo, tambourine
 Gillian Welch - backing vocals, banjo, acoustic guitar, electric bass, "voice of Lucy"
 Pat Sansone - piano (5, 9, 11), Chamberlin and organ (6), backing vocals (2)
 Emmylou Harris - backing vocals (5)
 Kim Richey - backing vocals (9)
 Allison Pierce - backing vocals (11)

Production
Ethan Johns – producer, engineer, mixer
Patrick Himes – assistant engineer
Doug Sax – mastering
David McClister – photography
Gina Binkley – design

Other information
"Shakedown on 9th Street" was covered on the Red Dirt band No Justice's Live at Billy Bob's album in 2007.

"Oh My Sweet Carolina" has been covered at least twice.  The song can be heard on the deluxe edition of Zac Brown Band's 2010 album You Get What You Give, as well as on the 2008 Portastatic release Some Small History. Contestant Paul McDonald sang "Come Pick Me Up" on American Idol.

English DJ Mark Ronson remixed the song "Amy" for his 2007 album Version, of which singer Kenna provides vocals. The song "To Be Young (Is To Be Sad, Is To Be High)" is featured in the 2006 film Accepted, the 2002 film The Slaughter Rule, and the 2003 film Old School. A version of this song was also released in 2009 by David Rawlings on the Dave Rawlings Machine album A Friend of a Friend. "Come Pick Me Up" is featured in the film Elizabethtown (which also featured two other Ryan Adams songs) and in a Series 2 episode of Skins. It was also named #285 on Pitchfork Media's "Top 500 songs of the 2000s". Joan Baez would cover "In My Time of Need" in 2003.

Elton John has famously credited the Heartbreaker'' album as helping to regenerate his career and in 2002 he performed songs from it with Ryan Adams and did a joint interview with him where he thanked Ryan.

Charts

Album

References

Ryan Adams albums
2000 debut albums
Albums produced by Ethan Johns
Bloodshot Records albums